Gampalagudem mandal is one of the 20 mandals in NTR district of the state of Andhra Pradesh in India. It is under the administration of Tiruvuru revenue division and the headquarters are located at Gampalagudem town. The mandal is bounded by Tiruvuru, A. Konduru mandals of Krishna district in Andhra Pradesh and Khammam district of Telangana state.

Demographics 

 census, the mandal had a population of 71,544. The total population constitute, 36,215 males and 35,329 females —a sex ratio of 976 females per 1000 males. 7,071 children are in the age group of 0–6 years, of which 3,650 are boys and 3,421 are girls. The average literacy rate stands at 60.25% with 38,847 literates.

Administration 

Gampalagudem mandal is one of the 4 mandals under Tiruvuru (SC) (Assembly constituency), which in turn represents Vijayawada (Lok Sabha constituency) of Andhra Pradesh.

Towns and villages 

 census, the mandal has 21 villages. The settlements in the mandal are listed below:

Note: †–Mandal Headquarters

See also 
List of mandals in Andhra Pradesh
List of revenue divisions in Andhra Pradesh

References 

Mandals in NTR district